The following is a list of National Collegiate Athletic Association (NCAA) Division I college baseball team statistics as of the conclusion of the 2017 season, including all-time number of wins, losses, and ties; number of seasons played; and percent of games won.

This list includes record as a senior college only, and only teams with 25 or more seasons in Division I included.

Winningest Baseball Programs as of Conclusion of 2017 Season

See also
Baseball statistics
NCAA Division I Baseball Championship

References

Statistics, team